is a Japanese professional football club based in Yamaguchi, the capital of Yamaguchi Prefecture. They currently play in the J2 League, the second tier of professional football in Japan's football league system.

History 
The original football team consisted of a group of teaching staff who were based within Yamaguchi prefecture, a team called , often abbreviated to Yamaguchi Teachers or Yamaguchi KFC (compare Tochigi S.C. and Gainare Tottori, who started as teachers' clubs and are now members of the J.League).

In February 2006, the Yamaguchi Football Association eyed the placement of a team from Yamaguchi in the J.League. Setting its heart of operations at Yamaguchi Teachers, a new football club was established. At the same time, a public appeal was made to name the new club, with Renofa Yamaguchi F.C. being decided in March of the same year. The word renofa is a wasei-eigo, a combination of three English words: renovation, fight and fine.

Without a specified home ground, the team played Chūgoku league matches across a number of different venues within the prefecture, including Yamaguchi Ishin Park Stadium, Yamaguchi Kirara Expo Memorial Park, Onoda Football Park, Shunan City Athletic Stadium and Yamaguchi Football Park. Now however, home games are played at Yamaguchi Ishin Park Stadium.

Though structured with a hometown manager and local players, sponsored by local business and enterprises, and local action plans within the local community, Renofa Yamaguchi F.C. is aiming for a national future in the J.League.

In the days of Yamaguchi Teachers, the team frequently finished mid to low table in the Chūgoku league. However, since the establishing of the new club in 2006, the team had consistently improved their final league position. This culminated in the 2008 season where they achieved their first league win. In the All Japan Regional Football Promotion League Series of that year the team finished fourth in the final round, missing the opportunity for promotion to the Japan Football League. The 2009 season saw them win their first Emperor's Cup match, beating Mitsubishi Motors Mizushima F.C. in a penalty shoot out.

Since the team's formation it had operated as a private organisation, however when the Nonprofit organization Yamaguchi Athletics Club was established on 24 May 2011, managing control of the team changed hands putting the new NPO in charge.

After the club finished on 4th-place in 2014 Japan Football League and passed the necessary licensing, J.League officially admitted Renofa Yamaguchi to participate in J3 League, starting from the 2015 season. Their J.League debut came in 2015 season. On 23 November 2015, Renofa earned their first and successful promotion from the JFL after winning the J3 League. The club was promoted for the J2 League ahead of the 2016 season. The club was guaranteed promotion after a 2-2 draw against Gainare Tottori in the closing rounds of the season, as Renofa were working towards J2 licensing before the season ended, for the promotion to be actually earned. The club will play their 8th consecutive season at the J2 League on 2023.

Changes in club name 
  (Yamaguchi Teachers, Yamaguchi KFC) (1949–2005)

  (2006–)

Team results and managers 
(Note that prior to the 1991 season a team would earn two points for a win)
(From 1997 to 2006 when a match ended in a draw, a penalty shoot-out would occur. The winning team were awarded 2 points, and the losing team 1 point)

League & cup record 

Key

Honours 
As Yamaguchi Teachers
 Chūgoku League
 Runners-up (3): 1982, 1983, 1989
 Yamaguchi Prefectural Championship
 Winners (4)： 1999, 2001, 2003, 2004
 Yamaguchi Prefectural League
 Winners (1): 2004

As Renofa Yamaguchi FC
 Chūgoku League
 Winners (3): 2008, 2010, 2013
 Yamaguchi Prefectural Championship
 Winners (3)： 2007, 2009, 2010
 Noue Cup
 Winners (1): 2008
 Shakaijin Cup
 Winners (1): 2013
 J3 League
 Winners (1): 2015

Current squad 
''As of 6 January 2023.

Out on loan

Club officials 
For the 2023 season.

Managerial history 
League games only

Key
Source: J.League Data Site

Kit evolution

Training ground

References

External links 
 Official Site 
 Chūgoku League Official Site 

 
Football clubs in Japan
Sports teams in Yamaguchi Prefecture
Association football clubs established in 1949
1949 establishments in Japan
Japan Football League clubs
J.League clubs